Cyperus angolensis is a species of sedge that is native to parts of Africa.

The species was first formally described by the botanist Johann Otto Boeckeler in 1880.

See also
 List of Cyperus species

References

angolensis
Taxa named by Johann Otto Boeckeler
Plants described in 1880
Flora of Angola
Flora of Burundi
Flora of Cameroon
Flora of Chad
Flora of the Democratic Republic of the Congo